Deysy María Montes de Oca Silverio (born March 13, 1990 in Santiago de los Caballeros, Santiago) is a Dominican taekwondo practitioner.

Career
At the 2008 Pan-American Championship held in Caguas, Puerto Rico, Montes de Oca defeated the Colombian Lorena Díaz to win the continental championship golden medal.

Montes de Oca won the golden medal in the 2010 Central American and Caribbean Games at the Over 73 kg category.

Montes de Oca was awarded "2010 Dominican Republic Taekwondo Female Athlete of Year" after her hard work during that year.
 She was also awarded in her native  province as "Female Athlete of the year" in the same year.

References

1990 births
Living people
Dominican Republic female taekwondo practitioners
Pan American Games competitors for the Dominican Republic
Taekwondo practitioners at the 2007 Pan American Games
Taekwondo practitioners at the 2011 Pan American Games
Central American and Caribbean Games gold medalists for the Dominican Republic
Competitors at the 2010 Central American and Caribbean Games
Central American and Caribbean Games medalists in taekwondo
21st-century Dominican Republic women